Brianite is a phosphate mineral with the chemical formula Na2CaMg(PO4)2.  It was first identified in an iron meteorite.  This mineral is named after Brian Harold Mason (1917–2009), a pioneer in meteoritics.

It was first reported from the Dayton meteorite in Montgomery County, Ohio in 1966. It occurs in phosphate nodules within the meteorite. Associated minerals include: panethite, whitlockite, albite, enstatite, schreibersite, kamacite, taenite, graphite, sphalerite and troilite.

See also
 Glossary of meteoritics

References

Phosphate minerals
Meteorite minerals
Monoclinic minerals
Minerals in space group 14